Souhayr Belhassen (born 1943 Gabès, Tunisia) is a Tunisian human rights activist and journalist. She has served as the President of the International Federation for Human Rights (FIDH) based in Paris since April 26, 2007. Belhassen is a vocal critic of former Tunisian President Zine El Abidine Ben Ali, who was ousted during the 2010–2011 Tunisian protests, calling the former government's crackdown on protesters "a massacre."

Souhayr Belhassen also participated in the writing of Habib Bourguiba. Biography in two volumes (co-written with Sophie Bessis) a biography of president Habib Bourguiba. 

She worked as a journalist for about twenty years. From late 1970s, she also worked as à correspondent in Tunisia, for the weekly Jeune Afrique and Reuters News Agency.   .  She was also very active in the fight for the defense of human rights in her country, by joining in 1984 the Tunisian Human Rights League, founded in 1977. In November 2002 she took over the organisation as vice-president. 

Born of a Tunisian parents in Indonesia, she is the granddaughter of Hachemi Elmekki, journalist and founder of nationalist satirical newspapers written in Tunisian Arabic.She graduated in law from the University of Tunis and then from the Institute of Political Studies in Paris.

In 2004, she joined the board of directors of the International Federation for Human Rights. She was elected on April 24, 2007 at the head of this NGO, replacing the Senegalese Sidiki Kaba who supported her.

Awards 
 In 2011, she was awarded the North–South Prize.
 On 30 April, 2011 Sohayer Belhassen obtained the "Takreem Arab Woman of the Year" The awards was presented to her at the Katara Cultural Village in Doha.

References

External links
Interview with Souhayr Belhassen (French)]

1943 births
Living people
International Federation for Human Rights
Tunisian human rights activists
Tunisian activists
Tunisian women activists
Tunisian women journalists
21st-century Tunisian women politicians
21st-century Tunisian politicians
People of the Tunisian Revolution
People from Gabès
20th-century Tunisian women writers
20th-century Tunisian writers
21st-century Tunisian women writers
21st-century Tunisian writers